The 2012 New South Wales Cup was the 105th season of New South Wales's top-level statewide rugby league competition. The competition is contested by eleven teams over a 30 Week Long Season (including Finals), which concludes with the 2012 Grand Final at ANZ Stadium in Sydney.

Ladder

Final Series Chart

Grand final
Newtown 22 (Daniel Tupou, Jack Bosden, Francis Vaiotu, Nafe Seluini tries; Daniel Mortimer 3 goals) defeated Balmain Ryde-Eastwood 18 (Ava Seumanufagai, Sean Meaney, Josh Davis, Dane Chisholm tries; Sean Meaney goal) at ANZ Stadium, Homebush on 30 September 2012.

Bundaberg Red Cup
The 2012 Bundaberg Red Cup season was the third tier rugby league competition held in New South Wales, after the National Rugby League and New South Wales Cup.

Ladder

Finals

Grand final
Wentworthville 16 (Cecil McKenzie, Mitch Stanfield, Pat Mataele tries; Aaron Fluke 2 goals) defeated The Entrance 14 (Mark Falaniko, Tim Nawaqatabu tries; Jake Fitzpatrick 3 goals) at St Mary's League Stadium on September 22, 2012.

See also

References

External links

New South Wales Cup
2012 in Australian rugby league
2012 in New Zealand rugby league